The Grattai Mountain, a mountain located within the Nandewar Range, is situated within the North West Slopes region of New South Wales, Australia. The mountain was formed by the Nandewar Volcano around 21 million years ago.

It is rarely climbed due to its isolation, lack of walking tracks and the cliffs which almost encircle the summit plateau. For those who do make it to the top, a visitors log is located in a metal box underneath a large rock.

See also 

 List of mountains in New South Wales

References

Mountains of New South Wales
North West Slopes